The Aeronauts is a 2019 biographical adventure film directed by Tom Harper and written by Jack Thorne, from a story co-written by Thorne and Harper. The film is based on the 2013 book Falling Upwards: How We Took to the Air by Richard Holmes. Produced by Todd Lieberman, David Hoberman, and Harper, the film stars Eddie Redmayne, Felicity Jones, Himesh Patel and Tom Courtenay.

The film had its world premiere at the Telluride Film Festival on 30 August 2019, followed by a showing at the 2019 Toronto International Film Festival. It was released in the United Kingdom on 4 November 2019, and in the United States on 6 December 2019. The film received mixed-to-positive reviews from critics and was a box-office bomb.

Plot 
In 1862 London, pilot Amelia Wren and scientist James Glaisher arrive for the launch of the largest balloon ever constructed. Despite being haunted by a vision of her late husband Pierre, Amelia keeps up the brave front and the balloon successfully launches to a cheering crowd. In a flashback, James appears before the Royal Society and explains his theory that the weather can be predicted, but his fellow scientists mock him and refuse to finance his studies. Returning home, he talks to his parents, who try to persuade him to pursue another avenue of science. On the balloon, James and Amelia start rising through the cloud layer. They soon run into a violent storm which sends the balloon spinning. In a flashback, Amelia is persuaded by her sister Antonia to attend a society function. There, Amelia is approached by James and he asks if she would be willing to pilot his balloon in a privately funded expedition while he attempts to prove his theories, to which she agrees.

Although James suffers a head injury while being thrown around, he and Amelia make it through the storm and continue rising. James releases the first of five pigeons carrying messages stating the current altitude along with other scientific readings in case they don't survive. They discover an air current which is home to a group of butterflies, confirming a theory of James' friend John Trew that insects can travel on air currents. In a flashback, as James practices for the flight, Amelia visits to tell him she has changed her mind. Eventually, the balloon exceeds , beating the record for the highest altitude. Amelia is shocked to learn that James didn't bring any clothes suitable for the rapidly decreasing temperature and decides to start descending. James refuses, and the two argue. Amelia agrees to keep rising, but makes it clear to James that they'll have to start descending soon.

In a flashback, John goes to see Amelia, telling her that she has an obligation to advance the cause of science. Amelia then goes to Pierre's grave to reflect. When it begins to snow (which John told her James had predicted), she decides to go with him after all. In the balloon, James starts experiencing hypoxia from the altitude but insists they continue and tries to stop Amelia from descending. He relents only when Amelia tells him the story of how Pierre sacrificed himself to save her during a balloon flight. Amelia discovers the gas release valve on top of the balloon is frozen. As James falls unconscious, she has no choice but to climb up the outside of the balloon and open the valve from the top. With frostbite setting in on her hands, she struggles to wedge her boot in the valve, causing a slow release of the gas. Amelia loses consciousness and topples over the side but is saved by her rope tether.

When she awakens, Amelia manages to swing back to the balloon and rouse James. As they continue to descend, snow begins to hover around them, indicating that the balloon is collapsing from the loss of too much gas. They manage to close the gas release and throw everything they can over the side, including all of James' equipment. When this doesn't work, they climb into the framework and release the basket. Realising that Amelia is ready to sacrifice herself to save him, James is able to convert the rest of the balloon into a parachute, which slows their descent. They crash through trees and hit the ground hard, with Amelia being dragged along behind the balloon. She wakes and calls for James, who staggers towards her. James' findings prove the existence of layers in the atmosphere, paving the way for the first weather forecasts, and he and Amelia build a new balloon so they can continue to conduct research together.

Cast

Production 

In December 2016, Amazon Studios purchased the film rights to Jack Thorne's spec script. In mid-2018, Felicity Jones and Eddie Redmayne were confirmed to star in the film. They were reunited after The Theory of Everything (2014), directed by James Marsh, as their past work and real-life friendship would help them in this new collaboration.

Principal photography began in early August 2018, in West London Film Studios, with George Steel serving as cinematographer. Filming locations in England included the Royal Naval College, Greenwich, Regent's Park, London, Claydon House, Buckinghamshire, the Bodleian Library in Oxford, Wrotham Park, London and The Historic Dockyard Chatham in Kent.

Key action sequences in The Aeronauts were designed for IMAX and feature an expanded aspect ratio for both IMAX and select Premium Large Format cinemas.

Historical accuracy 
The film is based on an amalgam of the flights detailed in Richard Holmes' 2013 book Falling Upwards: How We Took to the Air. The most significant balloon flight depicted in The Aeronauts is based on the 5 September 1862 flight of British aeronauts James Glaisher and Henry Coxwell whose coal gas-filled balloon broke the world flight altitude record, reaching . However, while Glaisher appears in the film, Coxwell has been replaced by Amelia, a fictional character.

A report in The Daily Telegraph quotes Keith Moore, Head of Library at the Royal Society, as saying, "It's a great shame that Henry [Coxwell] isn't portrayed because he performed very well and saved the life of a leading scientist". Moore then criticised the film's fictional female protagonist, stating “There were so many deserving female scientists of that period who haven't had films made about them. Why not do that instead?" In an interview with The List, Harper explained that whilst the film was inspired by a number of historical flights, the intention was never to make a documentary and he wanted the film to be reflective of a contemporary audience. He also commented on a gender bias in science, stating "There were female scientists around at the time, but not in the Royal Society... to this day, only eight per cent of the Royal Society is female."

Other critics of the film have praised Amelia as an important, aspirational female character. Sasha Stone of Awards Daily wrote that The Aeronauts "inspires young girls and nudges the perspectives of young boys... (revealing) that women can be just as excited about taking a hero's journey as any man can."

In addition to Coxwell, real-life individuals who compose Amelia's character include:
 Sophie Blanchard, the first woman to work as a professional balloonist, who became a celebrated aeronaut following her husband's death. Felicity Jones has stated that Blanchard was the inspiration for her character.
 Margaret Graham, a British aeronaut and entertainer.

Amelia's relationship with husband Pierre is chiefly based on Sophie Blanchard's flights with husband Jean-Pierre Blanchard, while Pierre's death is inspired by that of Thomas Harris on 25 May 1824.

Release
The film had its world premiere at the Telluride Film Festival on 30 August 2019. It also screened at the 2019 Toronto International Film Festival on 8 September 2019. Entertainment One gave the film a full theatrical release in the United Kingdom on 4 November, including screenings in 4DX and IMAX. Amazon Studios released the film in the United States on 6 December for a limited theatrical run, before debuting it on Amazon Prime Video outside of the United Kingdom on 20 December 2019. The film was released in China, on November 13, 2020.

In October 2019, it was announced that The Aeronauts would screen at the IMAX TCL Chinese Theatre as part of AFI Fest.

Streaming 
Although Amazon does not release exact streaming figures, Jennifer Salke, Head of Amazon Studios said in an interview with Deadline Hollywood that as of January 2020 The Aeronauts was the most viewed movie of all time on Amazon Prime.

Reception

Box office 
The Aeronauts has grossed an estimated $340,000 in North America and $3.5 million in other territories, for a worldwide total of $3.8 million, against a production budget of $40 million.

As with its other release The Report, Amazon did not publicly release box office results for the film. Of the 186 locations that did screen it in its opening weekend (6 December 2019) 48 reported a combined gross of around $30,000. IndieWire estimated the film made a total of $185,000 in its opening weekend, an average of $1,000 per-venue. It then made an estimated $100,000 from 85 theatres in its second weekend, before its 20 December streaming debut on Amazon Prime.

Critical response 
The website's critics consensus states, "Thrilling visuals and the substantial chemistry of its well-matched leads make The Aeronauts an adventure well worth taking." On Metacritic, the film has a weighted average score of 60 out of 100, based on reviews from 37 critics, indicating "mixed or average reviews".

Todd McCarthy of The Hollywood Reporter wrote: "The Aeronauts achieves impressive elevation as a bracing and sympathetic account of two early and very different aviators who together reached literal new heights in a perilous field of endeavor." Fionnuala Halligan of Screen International wrote about the chemistry of the lead actors and the great craft on display in the film: "With the widest of wide-screens, the most vertiginous of vistas, this hot air balloon takes to the skies and soars." Tomris Laffly of Variety praised the visuals and the lead performers: "The duo [of Redmayne and Jones] hand-in-hand elevates The Aeronauts...from a flimsy action-adventure to something worth watching on the biggest possible screen, even if it operates on a handful of clichés with little character-based substance to speak of."

Many critics also applauded the film's special effects and visuals. Peter Bradshaw of The Guardian noted the film's "terrific special effects" and "high-anxiety suspense". Eric Kohn of IndieWire wrote: "When so many supersized blockbusters take the potential of CGI action for granted, The Aeronauts finds a fresh use for it by turning the exhilaration of discovery into a real visual treat." In a generally positive review, critic Bob Mondello showed special enthusiasm for the airborne scenes, writing: "I cannot say strongly enough that if you can see it in IMAX, you should see it in IMAX, where if you're even a little bit afraid of heights, it will likely scare you shoutless."

Accolades

Notes

References

External links 

 
 
 

2019 adventure films
2019 action drama films
2019 biographical drama films
2019 films
Action films based on actual events
Adventure films based on actual events
Amazon Studios films
American action adventure films
American action drama films
American adventure drama films
American aviation films
American biographical drama films
American nonlinear narrative films
Biographical films about scientists
British action films
British adventure films
British aviation films
British biographical drama films
British nonlinear narrative films
FilmNation Entertainment films
Films based on non-fiction books
Films directed by Tom Harper
Films scored by Steven Price
Films set in 1859
Films set in 1860
Films set in 1861
Films set in 1862
Films set in London
Films set on balloons
Films with screenplays by Jack Thorne
Amazon Prime Video original films
IMAX films
4DX films
Mandeville Films films
Films produced by David Hoberman
Films produced by Todd Lieberman
2010s English-language films
2010s American films
2010s British films